In baseball, a bat flip is the throwing of a baseball bat in such a way that it rotates several times before landing. It is typically done by a batter to show off after hitting a home run. This is in contrast to the usual practice of dropping the bat straight down as the batter begins running to first base.

Asia and Latin America
Bat flipping is popular in Asian and Latin American baseball leagues. In South Korea, the bat flipping tradition dates back to the 1990s, and has become increasingly frequent in the Korea Baseball Organization. It is not considered disrespectful and there is no retaliation in the Korean League. The practice is also common in Japan and Taiwan.

Canada and the United States
In Canada, and the United States, bat flips have traditionally been considered rude and inconsistent with baseball etiquette. Traditional etiquette and the unwritten rules of baseball espouse humility and discourage actions which may be interpreted as arrogant or showing up the opponents. Torii Hunter, a retired Major League Baseball player and fan of bat flips in Korean baseball, has stated that a player throwing a bat in such a manner during a game in the United States would likely face retaliation in a subsequent at bat, such as being hit by a pitch. In April 2015, Los Angeles Dodgers right fielder Yasiel Puig stated that he would flip his bat less frequently because he wanted "to show American baseball that [he's] not disrespecting the game."

José Bautista bat flip
During Game 5 of the 2015 American League Division Series between the Texas Rangers and the Toronto Blue Jays, Toronto outfielder José Bautista executed what Andrew Keh of The New York Times described as possibly "the most ostentatious bat flip in MLB history" after hitting a go-ahead, three-run home run off Rangers relief pitcher Sam Dyson. Bautista wrote an article about the bat flip published in November 2015 in The Players' Tribune. He said he "didn't plan it. It just happened", and that he was "caught up in the emotion of the moment" when he flipped the bat. Bautista was criticized for the bat flip, which he attributed to a failure to understand differences in cultural backgrounds of players.

The Bautista bat flip became an internet meme. Fans posted numerous responses to the event on Twitter, and shared videos on Vine and other social media websites and mobile apps. It was etched onto jack-o'-lanterns for Halloween, printed on T-shirts and Christmas sweaters, and was also the subject of a thigh tattoo for an Oshawa, Ontario man. It was also commemorated on a Topps 2016 Series 1 baseball card.  A corn maze in the Canadian province of New Brunswick was designed with the likeness of the Bautista bat flip. In 2019, the Twitter account MLB GIFS posted a GIF of the bat flip after the Toronto Raptors won the Eastern Conference Finals to advance to their first NBA Finals in franchise history.

Cricket 
In cricket, the term bat flip refers to the tossing of a bat, instead of a coin, to decide which of the 2 teams in a match will be given the option to decide whether it wants to bat or bowl first. Additionally, instead of calling "heads" or "tails", the player calling the toss will call "hills" or "flats" depending on which side of the bat they think will land facing up (i.e., the flat side of the bat or the raised side of the bat).

References

External links

Get ready for the 50 greatest bat flips of all time, which includes Bautista's bat flip
Korean bat flip

Baseball culture
Batting (baseball)
Throwing